This list shows the top 50 National Football League quarterbacks with the highest career regular season passing yards, the top 25 NFL playoff passing yards leaders, and the historical progression of regular season record holders.

Tom Brady holds both the regular season record, with 89,214 passing yards, and the playoff record, with 13,400 yards, for a combined record total of 102,614 yards.

Regular season career passing yards leaders

Through  season.

Note: Y. A. Tittle passed for 33,070 yards in his professional career, which would place him in 43rd on this list, but 4,731 of those yards came in the All-America Football Conference (AAFC), which the NFL does not recognise statistics and records from to date. Thus, Tittle's career passing yards total in the NFL stands at 28,339.

Playoff leaders
Through 2022–23 NFL playoffs. Here is a list of the top 25 NFL players with the most postseason passing yards.

Historical passing yards leaders
Eleven players are recognised as having held the record as the NFL's career passing yardage leader. The longest record holder was Fran Tarkenton, who held the record for nineteen years.

Notes

See also
 List of gridiron football quarterbacks passing statistics
 List of National Football League annual passing yards leaders
 List of National Football League career passing completions leaders
 List of National Football League career passing touchdowns leaders
 List of National Football League career quarterback wins leaders
 List of National Football League records (individual)

References
General
 

Footnotes

Passing yardage leaders

National Football League lists